Fort Jefferson may refer to:
 Fort Jefferson (Florida)
 Fort Jefferson National Monument, now Dry Tortugas National Park
 Fort Jefferson (Ohio), a historic fort
 Fort Jefferson, Ohio, an unincorporated community
 Fort Jefferson (Kentucky)